Mladen Prskalo (born 16 June 1968) is a  Croatian handball coach and former player who player at the line position. He is currently head coach of Rudan Labin from Labin.

He is the uncle of goalkeeper Andrej Prskalo.

Career
Prskalo spent the majority of his career playing for Zamet, he also played for Rudar Labin, Mladi Rudar, Crikvenica and Austrian club Vöslauer HC.

As an international player he played for Croatia men's national handball team 13 times. He appeared at 1997 World Championship and 1997 Mediterranean Games where Croatia won a gold medal.

After retiring as a player from Zamet he became coach for half a season at the club. He was also a coach of RK Kvarner Kostrena for a season.

For three years he coached the RK Goranin youth team before coaching ŽRK Murvice from Crikvenica.

Honours

Player
Rudar Labin
Primorje and Istra Regional League (1): 1986-87

Zamet
Croatian First A League Vice champions (1): 1992

Mladi Rudar
Croatian First B League (1): 1999-2000

Coach
ŽRK Murvica
Croatian Second League (1): 2017-18

Individual 
Vöslauer HC top goalscorer 1994-95 season - 78 goals
Best senior team in Crikvenica - 2015

References

External links
Eurohandball profile

1968 births
Living people
RK Crikvenica players
RK Zamet players
RK Zamet coaches
RK Kvarner coaches
People from Labin
Handball players from Rijeka
Croatian male handball players
Croatian expatriate sportspeople in Austria
Mediterranean Games gold medalists for Croatia
Competitors at the 1997 Mediterranean Games
Croatian handball coaches
Mediterranean Games medalists in handball